Marufabad (also Romanized as Ma‘rūfābād) is a village in Kabutarsorkh Rural District, in the Central District of Chadegan County, Isfahan Province, Iran. At the 2006 census, its population was 545, in 134 families.

References 

Populated places in Chadegan County